Vitas Kruglov (born 1990) Lithuanian, Company Director 

Kruglov or Kruglova (feminine), is a Russian last name and may refer to:

Alexander Kruglov (1852–1915), Russian writer
Dmitri Kruglov (born 1984), Estonian football player
Georgy Kruglov (1905–1984), Soviet painter
Leonid Kruglov (1916–1968), Soviet army officer and Hero of the Soviet Union
Nikolay Kruglov (b. 1950), former Soviet biathlete
Nikolay Kruglov, Jr. (b. 1981), Russian biathlete and son of Nikolay Kruglov
 Sergei Kruglov (politician) (1907–1977), Soviet politician
 Sergei Kruglov (poet) (born 1966), Russian poet
 Sergei Kruglov (sport shooter) (born 1985), Russian Olympic sport shooter
Larisa Kruglova (born 1972), Russian sprinter
Yelena Kruglova (born 1962), Russian swimmer

Surnames
Russian-language surnames